During the 2012-13 season, the British football club Walsall F.C. was managed by Dean Smith. The captain was Andy Butler.

Competitions

League One

Results

FA Cup

Incumbents
Manager – Dean Smith
Chairman – Jeff Bonser.
Shirt Sponsors – SR Timber Gold.
Kit Manufacturers – Diadora.

First-team squad
Squad at end of season

Left club during season

Squad statistics
Source:

Numbers in parentheses denote appearances as substitute.
Players with squad numbers struck through and marked  left the club during the playing season.
Players with names in italics and marked * were on loan from another club for the whole of their season with Walsall.
Players listed with no appearances have been in the matchday squad but only as unused substitutes.
Key to positions: GK – Goalkeeper; DF – Defender; MF – Midfielder; FW – Forward

References

Walsall F.C. seasons
Walsall